The QF 12 pounder 18 cwt gun (Quick-Firing) was a 3-inch high-velocity naval gun used to equip larger British warships such as battleships for defence against torpedo boats. 18 cwt referred to the weight of gun and breech (18 × 112 lb = 2,016 lb or 914 kg), to differentiate the gun from others that also fired the "12 pound" (actually 12.5 lb or 5.7 kg) shell.

Service

Royal Navy service 

Guns were mounted in:
  commissioned 1906
 s commissioned 1908
 Minotaur-class armoured cruisers commissioned 1908–1909

The gun was superseded in the anti-torpedo boat role on new capital ships from 1909 onwards by the far more powerful BL 4-inch Mk VII gun.

World War I land service 

In World War I four guns were landed for service in the East Africa campaign, on 10 February 1916, and were used until September. They constituted the 9th Field Battery manned by Royal Marines. They were originally towed by oxen and later by Napier lorries.

Fourteen of these guns were mounted in coast defence batteries in the 'Middle Line' of the defences of the Firth of Forth when it was established in 1915 (the batteries on Inchcolm (8 guns), Inchmickery (4) and Cramond Island (2). During the general revision of the defences in 1916/17 two of the guns were removed to store, four moved to other batteries (Hound Point and Downing Point). The document setting out the armaments of the Forth differentiate clearly between the 12cwt and 18cwt types, both of which were in use in the fortress.

Ammunition 
The gun fired the same 12.5 lb  shells as the other British "QF 12 pounder" guns, but used its own larger separate cartridge case to accommodate a larger quantity of cordite propellant.

See also 
 List of naval guns

Notes

References 
 General Sir Martin Farndale, History of the Royal Regiment of Artillery. The Forgotten Fronts and the Home Base, 1914–18. London: The Royal Artillery Institution, 1988.
 Tony DiGiulian, British 12-pdr (3"/50 (7.62 cm)) 18cwt QF Mark I

External links 

Naval guns of the United Kingdom
76 mm artillery
Elswick Ordnance Company
World War I naval weapons of the United Kingdom